Panamericana Televisión  is a Peruvian television network that is owned by conglomerate Grupo enfoca. It was founded on July 21, 1957, by Genaro Delgado Parker (1929-2017). El caso Caryl Chessman was the first telenovela produced by the network.

1960s

1960

1961

1962

1963

1964

1965

1966

1967

1968

1969

1970s

1970

1971

1972

1973

1974

1975

1976

1977

1978

1979

1980s

1980

1984

1985

1986

1987

1988

1989

1990s

1990

1994

1995

1996

1998

1999

2000s

2000

2001

2002

2004

2005

2006

References 

Panamericana Televison